Opilioacaridae is the sole family of mites in the order Opilioacarida, made up of about 13 genera. The mites of this family are rare, large (1.5 to 2.5 mm) mites, and are widely considered primitive, as they retain six pairs of eyes, and abdominal segmentation. They have historically been considered separate from other mites belonging to Acariformes and Parasitiformes, but are now generally considered a subgroup of Parasitiformes based on molecular phylogenetics.

The first member of the Opilioacarida to be discovered was the Algerian species Opilioacarus segmentatus, which was described by Carl Johannes With in 1902, followed by the Sicilian Eucarus italicus and Eucarus arabicus from Aden, both in 1904. Two fossil specimens are known, one of which was discovered in Baltic amber from the Eocene, while the other one was discovered in the Burmese amber from the Late Cretaceous (Cenomanian) around 99 million years old, tentatively assigned to the living genus Opilioacarus.

Members of the group live in semi-arid and tropical environments in leaf-litter, under rocks and in caves. Their diet is known to include arthropod carcasses, fungal spores, and pollen.

Genera 
These 13 genera belong to the family Opilioacaridae:

 Adenacarus Hammen, 1966
 Amazonacarus Vázquez, Araújo & Feres, 2014
 Brasilacarus Vázquez, Araújo & Feres, 2015
 Caribeacarus Vázquez & Klompen, 2009
 Indiacarus Das & Bastawade, 2007
 Neocarus Chamberlin & Mulaik, 1942
 Opilioacarus With, 1902
 Panchaetes Naudo, 1963
 Paracarus Chamberlin & Mulaik, 1942
 Phalangiacarus Coineau & Hammen, 1979
 Salfacarus Hammen, 1977
 Siamacarus Leclerc, 1989
 Vanderhammenacarus Leclerc, 1989

References

External links

Acari taxonomy
Arachnid orders
Monotypic arthropod taxa